Malcolm Marshall, a former right-arm fast bowler, represented the West Indies cricket team in 81 Tests between 1978 and 1992. In cricket, a five-wicket haul (also known as a "five–for" or "fifer") refers to a bowler taking five or more wickets in a single innings. This is regarded as a notable achievement, and only 41 bowlers have taken at least 15 five-wicket hauls at international level in their cricketing careers. In Test cricket, Marshall took 376 wickets, including 22 five-wicket hauls. The cricket almanack Wisden described him as "one of the greatest fast bowlers of all time", and named him one of their Cricketers of the Year in 1983. He was inducted into the ICC Cricket Hall of Fame as an inaugural member in January 2009. Mark Nicholas, a cricket commentator, once wrote that former Pakistan captain, Imran Khan, "calls Malcolm the greatest of all fast bowlers".

Marshall made his Test debut in December 1978 against India at the Karnataka State Cricket Association Stadium, Bangalore. His first five-wicket haul came in March 1983 against the same team at the Queen's Park Oval, Port of Spain; he took 5 wickets for 37 runs. In December 1984, against Australia at the Adelaide Oval, he took a five-wicket haul in both innings of a Test match for the first time. He repeated this feat once more in his career, against India at the Queen's Park Oval in April 1989. Marshall's career-best bowling figures for an innings were 7 wickets for 22 runs against England at Old Trafford, Manchester, in June 1988. He took 9 wickets for 41 runs in the match; West Indies won the match by an innings and 156 runs, and he was awarded man of the match for his performance. Marshall was most successful against Australia taking seven five-wicket hauls. He took ten or more wickets in a match on four occasions.

Marshall made his One Day International (ODI) debut against England at Headingley, Leeds, during the 1980 Prudential Trophy. He never took a five-wicket haul in ODIs; his career-best figures for an innings were 4 wickets for 18 runs against Australia in 1991, a match West Indies lost at the Melbourne Cricket Ground. As of 2013, Marshall is sixteenth overall among all-time combined five-wicket haul takers.

Key

Tests

Notes

References

External links
 
 

West Indian cricket lists
Marshall, Malcolm